Miss Earth Sri Lanka is a pageant in Sri Lanka to choose ambassador for the Miss Earth pageant.

History
Sri Lanka debut in 2011 at Miss Earth pageant by TV Derana Production. Miss Earth Sri Lanka in under organization who mentioned other International pageants for Sri Lanka, its including; Miss Earth, Miss Globe INternational. Top Model of the World, Miss Intercontinental pageant and Miss Tourism World.

Requirements
Entries for the pageant are now being accepted for girls between the ages of 17–25 with a minimum height of 5ft 4in. The best 12 will be chosen for the pageant. All our contestants will go through rigorous training programs aided by experts from the fields of fashion and beauty.

TV Derana is prepared to bring all the exclusive footage surrounding our contestants' journey in the format of a reality TV show spanning 3 months. The show will lead up to a gala event at which the 5 brand ambassadors will be chosen by an elite group of judges.

Titleholders
Color keys

See also
Miss Universe Sri Lanka
Miss World Sri Lanka
Miss Sri Lanka Online

References

External links
 Official website

Miss Earth by country
Beauty pageants in Sri Lanka
Sri Lankan awards